James Robert Toberman (1836 – January 26, 1911) served six one year terms as Mayor of Los Angeles. He first served between 1872 and 1874 and again from 1878 to 1882. Mayor James R Toberman switched on the city's first electric streetlights.  He helped map out the first street car grid and water and sewer systems.  Toberman came to Los Angeles in 1864 when president Abraham Lincoln appointed him U.S. Revenue Assessor.

Toberman was elected to the Los Angeles Common Council, the governing body of the city, in a special election on February 23, 1870, for a term ending on December 9 of that year.

Some of the accomplishments during his terms in office are; The Toberman Neighborhood Center (Toberman Settlement House), The creation of Chamber of Commerce, the Los Angeles Herald, the Athletic Club, the Los Angeles Normal School (which became the Los Angeles branch of the University of California/UCLA in 1919) was founded, the first synagogue was organized, the first street (Main Street) was paved and the city turned on its new electric lights, the first telephone lines were installed in 1874, the first orange trees were planted along city streets, plans were laid for the city's water and sewer systems.  Toberman cut taxes from $1.60 to $1 per $100 of assessed value.  Toberman also left a surplus of $25,000 in the city treasury.

References

External links

Mayors of Los Angeles
Los Angeles Common Council (1850–1889) members
19th-century American politicians
1836 births
1911 deaths
Burials at Evergreen Cemetery, Los Angeles